The American Legion Handicap was an American Thoroughbred horse race at Saratoga Race Course in Saratoga Springs, New York open to horses of either sex age three and older. It was contested over a distance of seven furlongs on dirt, except for 1948 and 1949 when it was set at one mile (8 furlongs). The race was run for thirty-two years from 1927 through 1948.

Historical notes
The inaugural running took place on August 6, 1927 and was won Cheops, a three-year-old brown colt owned by the very prominent Rancocas Stable. The race was created to honor American war veterans but during World War II also became a fund raising event to support the war effort. In 1943 government wartime restrictions meant the race had to be hosted that year by the Belmont Park racetrack in Elmont, New York.

During the July 26, 1937 racing program that included the American Legion Handicap, tragedy struck the Saratoga facilities when, during a severe electrical storm, a bolt of lightning killed one horse and knocked eight others unconscious. The lightning struck the barn housing Thoroughbreds owned by King Ranch plus those of Anna Corning. The lightning then hit a stall killing the two-year-old filly Gino Vive belonging to Willis Sharpe Kilmer.

The 1938 race was won by Alfred G. Vanderbilt Jr.'s Airflame whose winning time broke an eighteen-year-old track record.

The Canadian owned Arise, who had traveled to Saratoga in 1949 and won the prestigious Travers Stakes, returned to win the 1950 running of the American Legion Handicap and would go on to a career that would see him inducted into the Canadian Horse Racing Hall of Fame in 1983. 

The thirty-second and final running of the American Legion Handicap took place on August 8, 1958. On a sloppy racetrack, the five-year-old horse Reneged easily won by five lengths, beating eight other runners.

Records
Speed record:
 1:22.20 @ 7 furlongs : Greek Warrior (1945)

Most wins:
 2 - Microphone (1932, 1933)
 2 - Nedayr (1939, 1940)
 2 - Tea-Maker (1951, 1952)

Most wins by a jockey:
 3 - Hedley Woodhouse (1952, 1954, 1956)

Most wins by a trainer:
 3 - Phillip M. Walker (1932, 1933, 1935)

Most wins by an owner:
 3 - Joseph E. Widener (1928, 1930, 1941)
 3 - Greentree Stable (1934, 1944, 1955)
 3 - Alfred G. Vanderbilt Jr. (1936, 1938, 1940)

Winners

External links
Pathé News video - Airflame" wins American Legion Handicap at Saratoga

References

Discontinued horse races in New York (state)
Open mile category horse races
Saratoga Race Course
Belmont Park
American Legion
Recurring sporting events established in 1927
Recurring sporting events disestablished in 1948
1927 establishments in New York (state)
1948 disestablishments in New York (state)